Mélanie Bernier (born 5 January 1985) is a French actress. She has appeared in several films, such as L'Assaut (2011), directed by Julien Leclerq, relating the hijacking of an Air France A300 in December 1994, and also in several television productions. Bernier was born in Grasse, France, and grew up in Veigné, Indre-et-Loire. She began acting at a young age.

In 2010 she appeared on UK television as a judge in the ITV series 'Monte Carlo or Bust'.

Selected filmography 

 The Poisoner (2006)
 Sa majesté Minor (2007)
 Passe-passe (2008)
 My Afternoons with Margueritte (2010)
 The Assault (2010)
 Delicacy (2011)
 Populaire (2012)
 The Informant (2013)
 Les gamins (2013)
 Blind Date (2015)
 Our Futures (2015)
La prunelle de mes yeux(2016)
 Simon et Théodore (2017)
 Love Addict (2018)
 Mystère à la Sorbonne (2018)
 Mine de rien (2020)''
 Maigret (2022 film) (2022)

External links 

 

1985 births
Living people
French film actresses
French television actresses
Actors from Tours, France
21st-century French actresses